Aminiasi Tuimaba (born 26 March 1995) is a Fiji national rugby sevens team player. He plays the wing position. He is known for his speed and try scoring. He finished the 2018/19 season as the top try scorer for the Fiji Sevens team and the 2nd top try scorer in the series, in his rookie season. He is from Yasawa and was a sprinter for Natabua High School. He currently plays in the Top 14 for Pau

Tuimaba was part of the Fiji sevens team that won a silver medal at the 2022 Commonwealth Games.

References

External links

1995 births
Living people
Place of birth missing (living people)
Rugby sevens players
Section Paloise players
People from Yasawa
Rugby sevens players at the 2020 Summer Olympics
Medalists at the 2020 Summer Olympics
Olympic gold medalists for Fiji
Olympic medalists in rugby sevens
Olympic rugby sevens players of Fiji
Fijian expatriate rugby union players
Fijian expatriate sportspeople in France
Fijian rugby union players
Expatriate rugby union players in France
Sportspeople from Lautoka
Rugby sevens players at the 2022 Commonwealth Games
Commonwealth Games silver medallists for Fiji
Commonwealth Games medallists in rugby sevens
Medallists at the 2022 Commonwealth Games